The Sea You Festival (formerly Sea of Love) is a techno music festival that has taken place at Tunisee in Freiburg im Breisgau since 2002.

History

Sea of Love 
In 2002 the Sea of Love Festival, which was initially organised by the company Endless Event, garnered an audience of over 2,500 people. Sven Väth was the headline act. It ran as a one-day festival, however after 2004 one of the organisers, Bela Gurath, came up with the idea of making it a festival run across several days. In 2005 the artists Monika Kruse and DJ Rush headlined. The latter also headlined when the festival was still held over only one day (along with Felix da Housecat, Tiefschwarz and Turntablerocker).

In 2007 there was a stage that towered over the lake and another one set up in a tent. The headliners that year were The Disco Boys, Moguai and Moonbootica. After that the festival was confined to a Sunday. Furthermore, in 2008 when the headliners Felix da Housecat and Lexy (of Lexy & K-Paul) had to cancel due to illness, Monika Kruse and Tiefschwarz were then again called upon to headline. In 2009 a few previous headliners played for a crowd of over 6,000 people. In 2010 the festival ran, for the first time, over two days. On Saturday 2raumwohnung, Paul Kalkbrenner, Chris Liebing and Die Fantastischen Vier, played and on the Sunday 2Many DJs, Tiga, Karotte, Lexy & K-Paul, Marco Petralia and many more played. The number of festival goers rose to 15,000 in 2010.

At the end of 2010 well known artists such as Moby, Tiësto, Paul Kalkbrenner, Robyn und DJ Rush were named as headliners to celebrate the festival's ten-year run in 2011. For the first time the festival was spread across three days  and was therefore the second biggest music festival in Baden Wuerttemberg (after the Southside Festival). The audience numbers for the festival "Rock am See" fell from 23,000 to 13,000  but stabilised again in the years following to 25,000.

However, during the festival in 2011 the organisers were faced with huge problems: the event held on Friday evening in the Rothaus Arena of the Messe Freiburg was almost full with 6,500 spectators and as a result further 2,000 spectators were refused entry. According to data from the police, who later evacuated the Messe, the organisers hadn't complied with health and safety regulations. The camping grounds were also already overcrowded. At the time, parking places in front of various retail stores were blocked and the site for the papal visit "Baustelle für den Papstbesuch" was also damaged.

On Saturday evening there was confusion among festival goers over the rules of entry into the Messe, as an additional ticket was necessary. While the festival grounds had 25,000 spectators, the arena only permitted 13,000. The shuttlebus to the festival travelled through a tunnel, which reminded a lot of people of the incident at the Loveparade in 2010. This resulted in a lot of people travelling on foot to the Messe and roughly 40 of those people crossed the A5 motorway. The city council explained after the festival that they would have nothing more to do with the organiser as they couldn't, in their opinion, keep the event under control.

Sea of Love (New Management)  
By the end of 2011 it was common knowledge that the previous organisers had sold the rights to the event to the concert group KOKO &DTK Entertainment and had even been threatened with a fine which was later set at 100,000 euros. Koko announced that they wanted to stage the festival exclusively at Tunisee. In 2012 20,000 visitors were expected at the festival  which ran between 14 and 15 July, in reality 15,000 people attended over the two days to see artists such as Deichkind or Gorillaz Sound System. In December 2012 it was revealed that KOKO & DTK Entertainment wouldn't be organizing any more Sea of Love festivals on the same scale.

At the end of 2012, as a result of the circumstances in 2011, the Freiburg city council decided on how to organise future events and also came up with the idea of establishing an event management office in the first few months of 2013. This was approved at the municipal council meeting of 16 April 2013 for the Public Order Office.

Sea You 
In July 2014 the Sea of Love festival was held on a smaller scale under the new name 'Sea You' and was restricted to around 10,000 visitors. The organisers were the events group "Cosmopop". On 18 and 19 July 2015 the festival was held for the second time under the new name and management, attracting over 15,000 spectators.

Line-up

References

External links

Techno
Electronic music festivals in Germany